Ma Ying-jeou (born 13 July 1950) is a Hong Kong-born Taiwanese politician who served as president of the Republic of China from 2008 to 2016. Previously, he served as justice minister from 1993 to 1996 and mayor of Taipei from 1998 to 2006. He served as chairman of the Kuomintang (KMT) from 2005 to 2007 and from 2009 to 2014.

Ma first won the presidency by 58.45% of the popular vote in the presidential election of 2008, and was re-elected in 2012 with 51.6% of the vote. He was sworn into office as president on 20 May 2008, and sworn in as the Chairman of the Kuomintang on 17 October 2009; he resigned as chairman of Kuomintang on 3 December 2014. Ma's term as president saw warmer relations with Mainland China. He became the first ROC leader to meet with an incumbent General Secretary of the Chinese Communist Party (PRC top leader) when he met Xi Jinping in Singapore in November 2015. Both leaders addressed each other using the honorific Xiansheng (Chinese: 先生, "Mister").

Early life
Ma and his parents originate from Xiangtan, Hunan in the Republic of China (now Hunan, People's Republic of China), and their ancestral home was in Fufeng, Shaanxi Province. His ancestors had migrated from Shaanxi to Jiangxi and then finally to Hunan.  Researchers had purportedly visited the old residence of Ma's father, Ma Ho-ling (1920–2005), in Kaiyun Town, Hengshan County, Hunan, where they discovered a genealogy book stating that Ma descended from Three Kingdoms era general Ma Chao. His mother was Chin Hou-hsiu (1922–2013). Ma was raised Catholic.

He was born in Kwong Wah Hospital in Yau Ma Tei in Kowloon, part of then-British Hong Kong, on 13 July 1950. His parents were in Hong Kong on the way from Hunan Province of Communist China to Nationalist-held Taiwan after the Chinese Civil War. In a family of five children, Ma was the fourth child and the only son.

Ma earned his LL.B. degree from National Taiwan University in 1972. He served his compulsory military duty in the ROC Marine Corps and Navy from 1972 to 1974, obtaining the rank of lieutenant. He then pursued advanced studies in the United States, first earning an LL.M. degree from New York University Law School in 1976 and then an S.J.D. degree from Harvard Law School in 1981. An edited version of his thesis on the Senkaku Islands dispute was published in 1984.

After receiving his master's, Ma worked as an associate for a Wall Street law firm in New York City and as a legal consultant for a major bank in Massachusetts in the U.S. before completing his doctorate. Ma also spent time doing research at the University of Maryland School of Law and published some academic papers, so he has always felt a sense of gratitude toward the university. In 1981, Ma returned to Taiwan and started working for President Chiang Ching-kuo.

Ma is married to Christine Chow, and the couple has two daughters. Lesley (Ma Wei-chung) was born in 1981 in New York City while Ma was attending Harvard. She completed her undergraduate studies in life sciences at Harvard University and then her graduate studies at New York University. Ma's younger daughter is Ma Si-Rui, who was born in Taiwan and completed her masters at London School of Economics and is currently pursuing her doctorate at Nanyang Technological University.

Ma and his wife sponsor children of low-income families in El Salvador through World Vision. On an official trip to Central America in June 2009, Mrs. Ma was able to meet with one of her sponsored children, an 11-year-old boy in San Salvador.

Ma is the uncle of Gene Yu, an American, former US Army Special Forces captain and the author of the Yellow Green Beret: Stories of an Asian-American Stumbling Around U.S. Army Special Forces series of books. Yu was instrumental in negotiating, locating and working to free Taiwanese citizen Chang An-wei from Abu Sayyaf militants with Filipino special forces and private security contractors in 2013.

Controversy over birthplace
On 11 December 2008, Democratic Progressive Party (DPP) legislator Chai Trong-rong called a press conference and produced a document that alleges Ma's birthplace to be contrary to what is officially reported. On this document, the birth certificate for one of Ma's daughters, Ma fills out "Shengchin"  as his own birthplace, contradictory to his officially reported birthplace of "Hong Kong".

Chai also noted that First Lady Christine Chow's birthplace was listed as "Nanking, China", though she is listed as also being born in Hong Kong.

Chai claimed that since Ma was born after 1949 and in Shenzhen, he is legally a citizen of the People's Republic of China. Presidential Spokesperson Wang Yu-chi responded to Chai's charges by reaffirming that all information from the President's Office regarding the President's birth is accurate. Wang also informed that Ma, on his 11 December visit to Hong Kong, was able to obtain records of his birth at Kowloon's Kwong-Wah Hospital and Ma also keeps the original of his birth certificate issued by the Registrar General of Hong Kong, thereby confirming once again his birth in the former British colony instead of mainland China. Copies of Ma's birth certificate have also been previously shown to the public. Wang also dispelled rumors that Ma had received affirmative action in his applications to Jianguo High School and the National Taiwan University with an "overseas Chinese" status.

Rise in politics
In the 1980s Ma Ying-jeou started working for President Chiang Ching-kuo as Deputy Director of the First Bureau of the Presidential Office and the President's English interpreter. Ma was later promoted to the chair of the Research, Development and Evaluation Commission under the Executive Yuan at the age of 38, becoming the youngest cabinet member in the ROC government.

Ma was deputy secretary-general of the KMT from 1984 to 1988, also serving for a period as deputy of the Mainland Affairs Council (MAC), a cabinet-level body in charge of cross-strait relations. President Lee Teng-hui appointed him ROC Justice Minister in 1993. Ma was relieved of his post in 1996. His supporters claim that firing was caused by his efforts at fighting corruption among politicians and the police. He remained a supporter of the Kuomintang, rather than supporting the New Party formed by KMT supporters who campaigned on an anti-corruption platform. Ma returned to academia and most people at the time believed his political career to have effectively ended.

Mayoralty

In 1998, the KMT fielded Ma to challenge the then-incumbent Taipei mayor Chen Shui-bian of the opposition Democratic Progressive Party (DPP), who was seeking re-election. Despite Chen's public approval rating of around 70%, he was defeated.

In the 2000 Presidential Election, Ma remained loyal to the KMT and supported its candidate, Lien Chan, over James Soong, who had bolted from the party and was running as an independent. The competition between Lien and Soong split the Pan-Blue vote and allowed his former rival Chen to win the presidential election with less than 50% of the popular vote. The election result, combined with other factors, incited a great deal of anger against Ma when he tried to dissuade discontented Lien and Soong supporters from protesting by appealing to them in his dual capacities as Taipei City mayor and a high-ranking KMT member.

Ma was able to repair the political damage and, in December 2002, became the leading figure in the KMT by easily winning reelection as mayor of Taipei with the support of 64% of Taipei voters while DPP challenger Lee Ying-yuan received 36%. His solid victory, especially in light of opposition from both President Chen and former President and KMT chairman Lee Teng-hui, led many to speculate about his chances as the KMT candidate for the 2004 presidential elections, although nothing came of it.

Ma again dissuaded angry Pan-Blue supporters from protesting, following the very close re-election victory of President Chen in 2004 after the 3–19 shooting incident. Ma chose not to join in calls to challenge or contest the election. Ma also avoided associating himself with claims that the assassination was staged.

Ma suffered some political damage as a result of the SARS epidemic in early 2003 and was criticized for not mobilizing the Taipei city government quickly enough and for keeping Chiu Shu-ti, the public health director, who was previously criticized for her lack of concern for the outbreak. Flooding in metropolitan Taipei in 2004 also led to public questioning of his leadership and caused Ma's approval rating to slide.

During his time as Taipei's mayor, Ma had many conflicts with the central government over matters such as health insurance rates and control of the water supply during the drought. Ma also was implicated in a scandal of Taipei Bank stock releases in 2003. However, the case was dismissed after an investigation by the Taipei prosecutor. He was strongly criticized by the DPP for not allowing the ROC national flag to be flown along with a PRC flag during Asian Women's Football Championship held in Taipei. Ma responded that he was merely following Olympic protocol, which only officially recognizes the Chinese Taipei Olympic Flag and forbids ROC national flags from being shown in an Olympic Game Stadium.

His initiatives in administering the city of Taipei include changing the transliterations of street names and the line and stations of the Taipei Metro to Hanyu Pinyin, as opposed to Tongyong Pinyin. Ma has expressed mild support for Chinese unification and opposition to Taiwan independence. He opposed the 2004 referendum, which had been widely criticized by the U.S. and PRC. Nevertheless, his opposition to the Anti-Secession Law of the People's Republic of China, while other leaders of his party remained silent on the issue, led to him being banned from visiting Hong Kong to make a public speaking tour in 2005. He also criticized the PRC for the Tian'anmen crackdown.

Ma's cross-political following has led some to note him as a rare example of relative civility in the notoriously rough and tumble world of Taiwanese politics. Ma has generally avoided being accused of using the vitriolic and sometimes offensive rhetoric common in Taiwanese political debate. His academic background and bearing have helped cultivate the image of Ma as an honest, dispassionate technocrat. Despite this reputation, and his wooden speaking style and shy demeanor, Ma is also considered a charismatic figure and is popular among women and youth. On the other hand, Ma's critics claim that Ma, overeager to appear unbiased and/or neutral, is overly indecisive and lacks bold vision. Ma is often accused of avoiding being out in front on some of the more vigorous or controversial criticisms of President Chen or opposing parties, or involving himself in intra-party disputes. Among these critics, Ma has been referred to as a "non-stick pan" or "Teflon-man." Recently, there has also been some criticism of his stumping for election candidates suspected of and later indicted for corruption charges. Many in the Pan-Green Coalition expressed opinions that Ma misled voters by lending his clean charismatic image to unscrupulous candidates in his own party.

In recent years, Ma has increasingly employed Taiwanese (Hoklo) in public speaking, perhaps to avoid backlash for his parents' mainland China origins, and he has called himself a "child of Bangka (Wanhua)", identifying himself with the historic district of Taipei where he grew up. Others claim that Ma's mainland Chinese ancestry will further alienate members of the KMT who are "light-blue" vs. the pro-unification "deep-blue."

Mayoral controversies
While often nicknamed as the "Teflon pot" for his extreme preservation of his personal image, Ma was nonetheless caught in some political controversies. A series of mishaps during his tenure as the mayor of Taipei, including the administration problems that enlarged the extent of the Typhoon Nari (納莉風災), the shutdown of Hoping Hospital (和平封院事件), the Phosgene Incident (捷運光氣事件), the Scalping Incident (捷運扯頭皮事件) and the Human Ball Scandal (邱小妹人球事件) (in which a severely beaten four-year-old girl was bounced from hospital to hospital without treatment, until she died of her injuries), impaired Ma's reputation. However, Ma maneuvered through these incidents relatively unscathed.

One of Ma's most satisfactory mayoral constructions was the Maokong Gondola. However, the frequent breakdown of the gondola earned the residents' distrust of the new transportation system. One poll showed only 14% of the Taipei City residents were satisfied with it, and it even led to protests. The Taiwan Environmental Information Center (台灣環境資訊協會) states that the choice to use a gondola lift intended for temperate zones in a tropical zone shows the failure of the Taipei City government led by Ma.

Corruption allegations
On 14 November 2006, Ma was questioned by prosecutors over his alleged misuse of a special expenses account as Taipei mayor.  This occurred after Chen Shui-Bian was being investigated for corruption, and many KMT supporters believed that this prosecution was politically motivated.

At the same time, rumors surfaced that former party chairman Lien Chen would run in the presidential election of 2008. The incident may have affected the clean image of Ma and his political future. The next day, Ma admitted one of his aides forged receipts to claim Ma's expenses as Taipei mayor, and apologized for the latest political scandal. However, Ma argued that he, like most other government officials, regarded the special expense account as supplemental salary for personal expenses undertaken in the course of official duties and that his use of this account was legal.

On 13 February 2007, Ma was indicted by the Taiwan High Prosecutors Office on charges of allegedly embezzling approximately NT$11 million (US$339,000), regarding the issue of "special expenses" while he was mayor of Taipei. The prosecutor's office said that Ma had allegedly used government funds for personal use, such as paying for one of his daughter's living expenses while studying abroad and paying for his household utilities. Before that, Ma had admitted personal usage and claims that the special funds were simply a part of his salary but had used all funds for public use or public benefit (charity donations).

Shortly after the indictment, he submitted his resignation as chairman of the Kuomintang in accordance with party rules which prohibit an indicted person from serving as KMT chairman The resignation was initially rejected but then accepted by the party's Central Standing Committee before amending a clause that barred members from running for office if charged with a crime. Shortly after the resignation, however, Ma announced his presidential candidacy.

On 14 August 2007, the Taipei District Court found Ma not guilty of corruption. Ma's defense is that he viewed "Special Expenses" as essentially "Special Allowance", originally designed to compensate for mayor's "social spending" without actually raising salary. On 28 December 2007, the Taiwan High Court found Ma again not guilty of graft charges.

On 24 April 2008, the Supreme Court cleared Ma of corruption charges, delivering a final ruling in this matter before his inauguration on 20 May 2008. The island's highest court said Ma had neither collected illegal income nor tried to break the law. Ma's secretary, however, was found guilty and faced a year in prison for his own failures in administrative duties.

KMT chairmanship

Ma's prestige increased after the loss by Lien Chan in the 2004 ROC presidential election, as he is widely seen as the successor of Lien Chan. His handling of the post-election demonstrations of the Pan-Blue Coalition, in which he at one point sent riot police to control the demonstrations of his pan-blue party supporters, was generally seen as impartial. In 2005, Ma and Wang Jin-pyng were candidates in the first competitive election for KMT chairmanship. On 5 April 2005, in an exclusive interview with CTV talk show host Sisy Chen, Ma said he wished to lead the opposition Kuomintang with Wang, if he were elected its chairman, as their support bases are complementary. On 16 July 2005, Ma defeated Wang by a 72% to 28% margin, a margin larger than anticipated by either camp or news sources, despite Wang receiving a last-minute endorsement by the People First Party (PFP) chairman James Soong, who had retained significant following within the KMT. Some, particularly the supporters of Wang Jin-pyng, accuse Ma of unfairly implying that Wang is involved in "black gold" and criticized Ma's aides for being rude to Wang during the campaign. After the election, Ma had stated repeatedly that he wishes Wang to remain as first-ranked deputy chairman. Wang, however, has so far rebuffed the gesture, instead stating that he wishes to serve as a "permanent volunteer." Wang has, indeed, accepted a party post that is incompatible with vice chairmanship, effectively ending the possibility that he would be vice chairman, although after meeting with Wang, Ma had stated that he would "leave the position open" for Wang. Ma has also repeatedly stated that he had no plans to resign from the Taipei mayorship, even after he formally took over the chairmanship from incumbent Lien Chan during the 17th Party Congress of the KMT in August 2005.

Led by Ma Ying-jeou, the Kuomintang made a resounding win in the three-in-one election held on 3 December 2005. The KMT gained six more seats in the mayoral/magistratical race, from eight seats in the last election, to a total of fourteen seats. Before the election, Ma swore that he would quit the chairmanship if his party could not win over half of the seats, which was a first for a KMT chairman. It was a decisive win for Ma Ying-jeou as well, since he took over the party chairmanship only 110 days before. In the election, the KMT won back the counties of Taipei and Yilan, and the city of Chiayi, which had been the Democratic Progressive Party (DPP)'s strongholds for over twenty years. It was the first time in many years that the KMT regained popularity as far south as Cho-Shui River (Zhuo-Shui River).

Presidency

2008 presidential campaign

On the same day he resigned as chairman of the KMT, Ma also announced his intention to run in the 2008 presidential election. He was the official nominee of the Kuomintang for the 2008 presidential election.

Ma visited India and Singapore in June 2007 to increase bilateral exchanges as well as to gain legitimacy and experience for his 2008 presidential bid.

Ma's vice-presidential running mate was former premier Vincent Siew, Lien Chan's running mate in the 2000 presidential election.

During a campaigning event in an aboriginal community, Ma made a controversial remark. Responding to a question from an aboriginal woman, Ma said, "If you come into the city, you are a Taipei citizen... Aborigines should adjust their mentality – if you come into the city you have to play by its rules." This statement was thought to be extremely inappropriate.

U.S. green card issue

Democratic Progressive Party candidate Frank Hsieh questioned Ma for his possession of a US Permanent Resident Card. Ma denied having one and publicly expressed that no members of his family had one. However, the fact that Ma and his wife had applied for green cards and that his sisters and his elder daughter Lesley Weichung Ma are United States citizens caused controversy, as the DPP continued to question Ma's loyalty to the country. In response to the DPP attack on the US citizenship of his sisters and daughter, Ma commented that having a US passport or green card did not necessarily mean that someone was not loyal to Taiwan.

A week before the presidential election, incumbent President Chen Shui-bian vowed to quit if Ma could provide legal documents of the invalidation of his green card. The DPP presidential candidate Frank Hsieh also said that he was willing to withdraw from the race if Ma could prove, using official documents, that his green card was invalidated twenty years ago. Ma responded the next day to the president that he should work on improving Taiwan's economy instead of caring about the election so much; earlier, Ma also provided copies of US non-immigrant visas issued to him during the 1980s and 1990s, claiming the card was invalid, as such visas are not issued to green card holders.

Environmental criticism
Ma has been criticized by many environmental groups. His mayoral construction of the Maokong Gondola was criticized by the Taiwan Environmental Information Center. The construction of the Taipei Arena also drew negative reactions from these groups. The Society of Wilderness (SOW; 荒野保護協會) pointed out that of the three hundred and eighty-four trees that were moved for the construction, more than a hundred had already died. The city government said that the ages of the trees are unknown; therefore, they are not protected by law. The SOW then responded that, according to pictures taken by the United States Air Force in 1947 and 1948, these trees were present already during the Japanese rule era.

During his presidential campaign, Ma participated in one of the debates that discussed many topics, including environmental protection. The Taiwan Academy of Ecology evaluated the policies of both candidates Hsieh and Ma, and the secretary of its workstation in Taipei said that both candidates failed their expectations, but they had more hope for Hsieh than Ma because Ma's environmental concepts lack considerations of reality. In February 2008, several environmental groups created a list of commitments for the two candidates to sign. DPP candidate Frank Hsieh agreed to all the items on the list and signed it in March. Ma did not and emailed the group instead. The Taiwan Environmental Protection Union (TEPU) criticized Ma for ignoring important issues and not having the guts to sign the commitments.

After Ma was elected president on 22 March 2008, the Green Party Taiwan expressed its fear that president-elect Ma would focus too much on improving the economy and would ignore many critical environmental issues. The head of the Environmental Quality Protection Foundation also emphasized the importance of environmental protection as one of the factors of economic development.

Inauguration

Ma officially won on 22 March 2008 with 58% of the vote, ending eight years of DPP rule and becoming officially recognized as the sixth president of the Republic of China. Ma won with 7,659,014 votes against Hsieh's 5,444,949 votes. Ma's overwhelming victory in the presidential election gave him political mandate to make changes in Taiwan.

Ma took office on 20 May 2008. The inaugural ceremony took place in the Taipei Arena in Taipei. A state dinner took place in Kaohsiung the same day.

Ma was named among the 2008 Time 100 in its "Leaders & Revolutionaries" section. He is described by Time as "one of those rare politicians who have an opportunity to shape the destiny not only of their own nation but also of an entire region."

On 12 August 2008, Ma embarked on his first foreign trip as president. Ma's visit centered upon improving relations with Taiwan's Latin American allies. He attended the inaugurations of both Leonel Fernández of the Dominican Republic and Fernando Lugo of Paraguay. Ma also made a stop at Panama and met with President Martin Torrijos. There was an emphasis that there would be no new aid packages during the visits; if any new economic aid were to be announced, they would be announced from Taiwan and not from abroad. The trip included U.S. stop-overs in Los Angeles, Austin, and San Francisco. Ma's trip across the Pacific was via commercial flight and only chartered a smaller jet from the United States; he was accompanied by an 81-member delegation.

Cross-strait relations
Ma, in his inaugural address, laid out his promise in dealing with cross-strait relations that there would be "no reunification, no independence, and no war" (不統, 不獨, 不武) during his tenure as president. Critics argue that Ma, rather than follow his campaign promise, has been following his father's will instead, where Ma Ho-ling clearly states his final words were "Repress independence supporters; Lead (Taiwan) to unification." During an interview in England in 2006, Ma affirmed that his goal was to lead Taiwan to "eventual unification."

An article published in the 11 August 2008 edition of Time Magazine said that in less than three months' time, "relations between Taiwan and PRC have arguably seen the most rapid advancement in the six-decade standoff between the two governments. Ma launched direct weekend charter flights between PRC and Taiwan for the first time, opened Taiwan to mainland Chinese tourists, eased restrictions on Taiwan investment in mainland China and approved measures that will allow mainland Chinese investors to buy Taiwan stocks." He has also loosened bans on "Chinese brides," leading to social unrest over Chinese women who marry old veterans but file for divorce after they obtain citizenship.

During the Second Chen-Chiang summit visit by Chen Yunlin on 3 November 2008, chairman of the Beijing-based Association for Relations Across the Taiwan Straits (ARAT), the opposition Pan-Green Coalition criticized the visit as "taking steps toward eventual reunification" and damaging Taiwan's sovereignty. Opposition to the visit by the chairman of the ARAT also sparked massive peaceful rallies and protests organised by the opposition DPP party on 25 October 2008. Preliminary estimates place the number of protesters at around 500,000. Protesters accused Taiwanese President Ma Ying-jeou "of making too many concessions and moving too fast in relaxing restrictions on trade and investment with China." Government's polls have suggested that Chen Yunlin's visit and the government's policy of normalising cross-strait relations have support of 50% to 60% of the Taiwanese population.

Chen's visit was the highest level visit from mainland China to Taiwan that had taken place since the Chinese Civil War in 1949. Chen was expected to meet with his Taipei-based counterpart, Chiang Pin-kung beginning on 4 November 2008. The two sides signed four agreements on 5 November, detailing the loosening of restrictions with regards to air, marine, and postal links as well as better regulations on food safety. The Ma government refused to disclose the treaties only until days before they went into effect.

During Chen's visit in Taipei, he was met with a series of strong protests directed at himself and Ma Ying-jeou, some of which were violent, with Molotov cocktails being thrown by the protesters at riot police. A series of arrests were made after the protests, with a secret letter being sent from the police to a member of the media. Local police reported that 149 of its officers were injured during the opposition protests. Chen referred to Ma simply as "Mr. Ma," not as "President". However, this is consistent with the previous convention in 2008, when KMT ex-politician Lien Chan met Hu Jintao in Peru. Lien did not call the PRC leader Hu Jintao "President," but instead used his title "General Secretary" as the leader of the Chinese Communist Party (CCP) and the top position in PRC government.

After the chaos during and after Chen's visit, college students and professors launched a peaceful sitout, known as the Wild Strawberry student movement, demanding a more reasonable assembly law and a stop to police violence. A few days into the sitout, the prime minister Liu Chao-shiuan accidentally spoke of his opinion during an interview on air that he did not think the movement would last more than three days, angering students, professors, and the general public. In the end, the sitout lasted one month. Then, it moved into an organizational direction. However, the polls in two of Taiwan's biggest newspapers after the visit still reported that about 70% of the Taiwanese public considered Chen's visit to have a positive effect on Taiwan's development, while 22% of the respondents thought the effect would be negative, with the remaining 8% not expressing an opinion. The opposition Pan-Green caucus have continuously alleged this result being a form of media manipulation by the KMT. However, other major polls in Taiwanese newspapers and news websites have shown similar results regardless of political alignment.

On 7 November 2015, Ma met and shook hands with the Chinese Communist Party General Secretary Xi Jinping in Singapore within their capacity as Leader of Taiwan and Leader of Mainland China respectively. The meeting marked the first ever meeting between leaders of both sides since the end of Chinese Civil War in 1949.

Economic issues

One of Ma's promises as presidential candidate was called the "633 Plan", which promised economic growth rate of 6%, unemployment rate of less than 3%, and per capita income of more than US$30,000. At the time, the high unemployment rate (~4.06% in July) and consumer price index three months after Ma's inauguration were unprecedented, having not been seen in 28 years.

The economic downturn caused about 2,000 companies in Taiwan to go bankrupt in the six months following Ma's inauguration, according to a governmental commercial office in Taipei. The Taiwan Stock Exchange also fell to two-year lows in September 2008.

On 11 September 2008, Ma's cabinet unveiled a $5.6-billion USD ($180-billion TWD) economic stimulus package. Among the items of the package were infrastructure projects, economic incentives to small businesses, and other tax cuts. Stock transaction taxes were also halved for the next six months. Taiwan's economy was projected to grow 4.3% in 2008, down from 5.7 in 2007, according to Fitch Ratings.

Although an economic stimulus plan was introduced, Taiwan stocks still closed lower on 11 September 2008. The Financial Times describes Taiwan's economic downturn as results from "downward pressure driven by global factors." Analysts also point out that, "during its first 100 days in office, the government has made a series of bold steps to deregulate economic Cross-Strait ties. But as these policies coincided with the global downturn and foreign investors had already bought Taiwan stocks heavily before the election, betting on the reforms, the island's market has seen a sell-off worse than the regional average." Taiwan's government reported that the economy contracted 8.36 percent during the last three months of 2008. Taiwan's economy rebounded by growing 10% in 2010. A free trade agreement with China was signed in 2010 called the Economic Cooperation Framework Agreement (ECFA), which was accompanied by a debate and a protest.

Direct links policy
On 15 December 2008, Taiwan and the Chinese mainland resumed direct sea, air, and mail links, ending an almost six-decade-long ban between the two sides on such trips. Previous flights between the two regions required a connection in Hong Kong. As many as 108 flights per week as well as 60 cargo flights per month were scheduled, evenly divided between Taiwanese and mainland Chinese airlines.

Shipping companies, due to shorter voyages and time savings, are able to save up to US$120 million (TWD $4 billion) each year. Previously, shipping companies from both sides of the strait were required to reroute their ships into third-country waters. The two sides also agreed that neither the ROC nor the PRC flag will be displayed when a ship enters port.

In July 2009, Ma rejected the proposal to open the airspace of the Taiwan Strait to accommodate higher passenger traffic, citing that the Taiwan Strait airspace is important to Taiwanese security.

Bid for KMT leadership
Ma Ying-jeou registered as the sole candidate for the election of the KMT chairman on 25 June 2009 and won the next day with 93.87% of the vote. Ma inaugurated as the chairman of the Kuomintang on 12 September 2009. This would allow Ma to be able to meet with People's Republic of China (PRC) paramount leader Hu Jintao (at the time the CCP general secretary) and other PRC delegates, as he would be able to represent the KMT as the leader of a Chinese political party, rather than as head-of-state of a political entity unrecognized by the PRC. Ma, however, ruled out meeting his PRC counterpart Hu Jintao in a 14 July 2009 interview with Taiwan's Commercial Times newspaper. In the interview, Ma states, "A meeting in the capacity of a party chairman will not solve the problem because other people would still insist that I meet him as the president."

Typhoon Morakot

Typhoon Morakot, the worst typhoon to strike Taiwan in fifty years, hit Taiwan on 8 August 2009. In the storm's aftermath, President Ma was criticized for his handling of the disaster by both sides of Taiwan's political spectrum. Many news outlets likened Typhoon Morakot to being Ma's "Hurricane Katrina." Editorials and political commentators accused Ma of, among other charges, poor leadership and poor crisis management. Many critics believe that hundreds of lives could have been spared, had the Ma administration been aware of the typhoon's seriousness. Taiwan's political commentators were most critical of Ma's refusal to declare a state of emergency and fully mobilize the military. Instead, Ma Ying-jeou blamed the local governments, which were under the control of the DPP in Southern Taiwan, for not having the villagers evacuated earlier. Ma's approval ratings sank from 52% (in May) to 29% in a United Daily News poll. In an August 2009 CNN online poll, 82% of respondents wanted Ma to resign. An editorial piece lambasted Ma, saying, "[Ma] has been distant and arrogant, and he has only made [victims] more angry instead of comforting them...He has not shown decisiveness required in a leader when facing a sudden disaster."

Following pressure from the opposition, Ma took steps to publicly apologize for his government's failure to respond swiftly with rescue and recovery efforts. Ma cancelled 2009's Double Ten Day national celebrations and his state visit to the Solomon Islands for the Third Taiwan-South Pacific summit. A probe was launched to investigate why government response was slow and inadequate, and vice foreign minister Andrew Hsia tendered his resignation to Ma's premier, Liu Chao-shiuan. Defense minister Chen Chao-min also resigned before Liu himself stepped down.

Another controversy arose in the disaster's aftermath involved a document leaked from the Ministry of Foreign Affairs that instructed the ROC embassies and representative offices to turn down aid from foreign nations. Vice Foreign Minister Andrew Hsia made an explanation, saying that it was meant to say "presently" foreign aids were not needed, but nevertheless took the blame and offered to resign. However, critics were convinced that Hsia's resignation was only to cover-up the fact that Ma gave the order to turn down foreign aid.

2012 presidential campaign

Ma was eligible for a second term as president and ran for re-election.

In June 2011, when incumbent Vice President Vincent Siew announced he will retire and not seek a second term, Premier Wu Den-yih was chosen to replace Siew on the KMT's 2012 ticket. Ma was re-elected President with 51.6% of the vote against Democratic Progressive Party chairwoman Tsai Ing-wen.

Post-presidency
On 1 June 2016, it was announced that Ma planned to visit Hong Kong on 15 June to attend the 2016 Award for Editorial Excellence dinner at the Hong Kong Convention and Exhibition Centre and would deliver a speech on Cross-Strait relations and East Asia. The Tsai Ing-wen administration blocked Ma from traveling to Hong Kong, and he gave prepared remarks via teleconference instead.

In August 2016, Soochow University confirmed that Ma had rejoined the faculty as a lecturer. On 26 September 2016, Ma gave his first lecture which was about the history of Taiwan. Yet, as a chair professor of law, Ma was protested by students at Soochow University to ask for his resignation since he has repeatedly controversial legal opinions.

On 11 October 2016, Ma's office announced that he had accepted an invitation to attend and become one of the speakers at the World Chinese Economic Summit in Malacca, Malaysia which would take place on 16–17 November 2016.

In October 2017, a court ruled in Ma's favor in a defamation case he had brought against Liang Wen-chieh (梁文傑) of the Democratic Progressive Party in 2011, after Liang had claimed on TV that Ma had received NT$300 million in illegal political donations during a meeting with Chen Ying-chu (陳盈助). The court ordered Liang to pay NT$1.2 million (US$39,643).

In 2023, Ma will become the first Taiwanese leader of Taiwan to visit China since the civil war of 1949, with a trip slated for 27 March to 7 April. Ma's party, the Kuomintang has sat in opposition since the 2016 elections. The trip comes amidst rising tension between mainland China and Taiwan.

Family
Ma's father is Ma Ho-ling, his mother is Chin Hou-hsiu and his wife is Christine Chow Ma. Apart from that, he has two daughters, Ma Wei-chung and Kelly Ma.

Ma speaks Hunanese, Mandarin and English.

Political positions

View on independence
In February 2006, while visiting Europe, Ma said that although he and the KMT favor eventual unification, the KMT respects the opinions of Taiwanese people and independence is a choice for the people of Taiwan. This caused widespread criticism within the party and from the PRC. In a December 2005 Newsweek International interview, when asked about unification, Ma stated that "for our party, the eventual goal is reunification, but we don't have a timetable." Perhaps to deflect heavy criticism from the Pan-Green Coalition, the KMT later published an advertisement in the Liberty Times recognizing that independence is an option for the Taiwanese people. Wang Jin-pyng praised Ma for the policy shift, since Wang himself made a similar statement during the 2004 election, but James Soong said he was "shocked" and Lien Chan said he was never consulted. This event actually won some welcome voices from Southern Taiwan, where voters customarily favor the Pan-Green Coalition. One top KMT official said "we might as well let the measles out now so that we will be immune to it when election year comes close, because reunification or independence can be a hot topic by then."

Ma clarified later that the current KMT policy of retaining the status quo has not changed and has reiterated this position several times; further, he has also reiterated his party's support of the one-China policy. Ma has defined the status quo as the "Five No's." During a visit to the United States in March 2006, he proposed a "proactive" approach to cross-strait relations which he called the "Five Do's."

On 17 March 2008, Ma threatened to boycott the Beijing Olympics if elected, should the 2008 unrest in Tibet spiral out of control. After he was elected president, he refused to let the Dalai Lama visit Taiwan, citing the timing as inappropriate. He later approved a visit by the Dalai Lama to lead prayers for Typhoon Morakot victims in August 2009.

In April 2009, President Ma became the first ROC president to pay homage in person to the Yellow Emperor who is believed to have founded China as a nation more than 5,000 years ago. Accompanied by all his government leaders, the president sang the ROC's national anthem as the starter. Ma's spokesman said the president wanted to pay his respects to the Yellow Emperor on National Tomb-Sweeping Day in person to stress the importance of the Chinese ancestor-worshipping tradition. However, others saw the precedent-making ceremonies at the Martyrs' Shrine as meant to be a show by President Ma of his unprofessed commitment to maintain a close relationship between Taiwan and mainland China.

View on human rights and democracy
In June 2009, the anniversary of the Tiananmen Square protests of 1989 in Beijing, a leader of the Chinese democracy movement and then student leader Wang Dan visited Taiwan, as in previous years, to meet with Ma about human rights and democracy in China.  However, Ma postponed the appointment three times and eventually cancelled the appointment with Wang. In a press meeting with DPP Chairwoman Tsai Ing-wen, Wang Dan spoke of how it has become more difficult to see "President Ma" in comparison to "Mayor Ma of Taipei City." Wang stated that he understood the importance of the cross strait relationship to Taiwan's economy but also stated that a confident government should have nothing to be afraid of.

View on cross-strait relations
After his success in the presidential election, Ma Ying-jeou said he had no immediate plans to visit mainland China and would work to fulfill his campaign pledge to improve relations with mainland China, starting direct charter flights, allowing mainland Chinese tourists to visit Taiwan and lifting the ROC's legislative restrictions on the financial sector to invest in mainland China.

Since then, Ma Ying-jeou has emphasized the "1992 Consensus" as the existing basis for constructive dialogue and exchange between mainland China and Taiwan. On 12 April 2008, then Vice-President-elect Vincent Siew formally met with CCP General Secretary Hu Jintao at the Boao Forum in Hainan.

On 2 September 2008, Ma declared that the relations between Taiwan and mainland China were a "special relationship not between two nations", but one that can be handled invoking the "1992 consensus" between the two sides. While the governing authorities on mainland China and Taiwan cannot recognise each other as a legitimate government due to legal and constitutional reasons, Ma seeks that they would refrain from denying the other side being the de facto governing authority of one area of the state. On 18 October 2008, Ma said he hoped that a cross-strait peace accord could be reached during his term in office.

Ma has received criticism from the DPP, the opposition party, for allegedly praising the PRC on human rights, especially during the 20th anniversary of the Tiananmen Square Protests. Departing from his usual critical view of the Communists' handling of the 1989 protests, Ma made a statement about the PRC's recent improvements in human rights. That same day, he also asked the PRC government to face its history directly and honestly.

Within a week of his remarks on Tiananmen, Ma voiced support for the acceptance of simplified Chinese for written text and the continued use of traditional Chinese for printed text. Ma had to clarify his remarks regarding simplified characters at a 15-minute speech before the sixth International Conference on Internet Chinese Education on 19 June 2009. Ma reiterated his policy of urging the Chinese to learn the traditional system; his previous call was for the ability of Taiwan's population to recognize simplified characters and not for simplified characters to supplant the traditional system in Taiwan. In a 2004 speech hosted by Microsoft Taiwan, he had proposed for the traditional Chinese characters (literally: complicated characters) to be instead called the 'formal characters' (then the translation 'traditional Chinese characters' would be more appropriate as well).

In 2009, Ma spoke at a leadership conference in Taipei and called for peace with Beijing and for Taiwan's greater participation in international affairs. He said: "The Chinese civil war of the 1940s must never happen again. Peace never comes easily, because over 1,000 missiles deployed by Beijing are still aimed at Taiwan." In 2014, Ma received the Eisenhower Medallion from People to People International for his efforts in the East China Sea Peace Initiative, set up to mediate territorial disputes.

Between 18 March to 10 April 2014, the Sunflower Student Movement, initiated by a coalition of students and civic groups in the Legislative Yuan and later also the Executive Yuan, was a student-mainly mass movement to protest Ma's trade in services policy with mainland China. On 26 September 2014, a student protester hurled the book Formosa Betrayed at Ma and hit the president, who was not hurt by the incident. The Presidential Office condemned the act of violence.

Honours
:
 Grand Cross with Gold Breast Star of the Order of Merit of Duarte, Sánchez and Mella
:
Traditional Paramount Leader Medal (2014)
:
 Collar of the Order of St Christopher and Nevis (2011)
:
 Collar pro Merito Melitensi (2015)

See also

Politics of the Republic of China
Elections in the Republic of China
Political status of Taiwan

References

External links

Ma Ying-jeou Official Website (Traditional Chinese)
Corpus of Political Speeches Free access to political speeches by Ma Ying-jeou and other Chinese politicians, developed by Hong Kong Baptist University Library

|-

|-

|-

|-

|-

|-

1950 births
Chairpersons of the Kuomintang
Chinese Civil War refugees
Former Roman Catholics
Harvard Law School alumni
Hong Kong emigrants to Taiwan
Kuomintang presidential nominees
Living people
Mayors of Taipei
National Taiwan University alumni
New York University School of Law alumni
People from Boston
People from Kowloon
Presidents of the Republic of China on Taiwan
Taiwanese Ministers of Justice
Recipients of the Order pro Merito Melitensi